The Power of Eternity is the twentieth studio album from rock band Wishbone Ash. It marks the first recording to feature the band's new drummer Joe Crabtree, who replaced previous drummer, longtime member Ray Weston, during the recording of the album.

Track listing

Personnel
Wishbone Ash
Andy Powell –  guitar, lead vocals
Muddy Manninen –  guitar, vocals
Bob Skeat –  bass, vocals
Joe Crabtree –  drums

Additional personnel
Ray Weston –  drums on "Your Indulgence"
Miri Miettinen –  percussion on "Northern Lights"
Aynsley Powell –  rhythm guitar on "Disappearing"

References

2007 albums
Wishbone Ash albums